Moutushi Biswas is a Bangladeshi model and actress. She made her television debut in the program Adventure Bangladesh, aired in Ekushey Television Channel.

Career
Biswas hosts the ATN Bangla television program "Shera Rondhon Shilpi 2017".

Works

Films 
 Bachelor  (2004)
 U-Turn (2015) 
 Krishnopokkho (2016)

Television drama plays

Web series

References

External links
 

Living people
Bangladeshi film actresses
Bangladeshi television actresses
Bangladeshi television presenters
Year of birth missing (living people)
Bangladeshi women television presenters